Events during the year 1963 in Italy

Incumbents
President – Antonio Segni
Prime Minister – Amintore Fanfani (until 21 June), then Giovanni Leone (until 5 December), then Aldo Moro

Events
 28 April – General election.
 9 June – Sicilian regional election.
 30 June – Ciaculli massacre: Seven police and army officers are killed when a car bomb explodes in Ciaculli.
 21 September–29 September – The Mediterranean Games are held in Naples.

Births
 10 March – Anna Maria Corazza Bildt, politician

Deaths
 6 February – Piero Manzoni, artist (born 1933)
 18 February – Beppe Fenoglio, writer (born 1922)
 18 June – Fernando Tambroni, politician and prime minister (born 1901)

Notes

References

 
Italy
Italy
1960s in Italy